The Landau kernel is named after the German number theorist Edmund Landau. The kernel is a summability kernel defined as:

where the coefficients  are defined as follows

Visualisation of the Landau kernel 
Using integration by parts, we can show that:Hence, this implies that the Landau Kernel can be defined as follows: 

Plotting this function for different values of n reveals that as n goes to infinity,  approaches the Dirac delta function, as seen in the image to the right where the following functions are plotted:

 is blue

 is green

 is turqoise

 is purple

Properties of the Landau Kernel 
These properties are made more concrete in the following section.

Dirac Sequences 

The third bullet point means that the area under the graph of the function  becomes increasingly concentrated close to the origin as n approaches infinity. This definition lends us to the following theorem.

Proof: We prove the third property only. In order to do so, we introduce the following lemma:

Proof of the Lemma:

Using the definition of the coefficients above, we find that the integrand is even, we may writecompleting the proof of the lemma. A corollary of this lemma is the following:

See also 

 Poisson Kernel
 Fejer Kernel
 Dirichlet Kernel

References 
 Terras, Audrey (May 25, 2009). "Lecture 8. Dirac and Weierstrass" (PDF).https://mathweb.ucsd.edu/~aterras/ma142blecture8.pdf.
 Hilbert, Courant. Methods of Mathematical Physics, Vol. I. p. 84.

Citations 

Mathematical analysis